Elizabeth M. Harman (born April 23, 1973) is employed by the International Association of Fire Fighters (IAFF) in Washington, D.C.  She was appointed by IAFF General President Harold A. Schaitberger as the assistant to the general president for grants administration and HazMat/WMD Training Division February 25, 2013.

Most recently, and until November 26, 2012, Harman served as a presidential appointee, Senate confirmed in March 2010 and was appointed as the assistant administrator for the United States Department of Homeland Security (DHS), Federal Emergency Management Agency's Grant Programs Directorate (GPD).  Harman is a former fire fighter in Fairfax City, Virginia, and the director of the Hazardous Materials and Weapons of Mass Destruction Training Department at the IAFF.

During her service at the Maryland Emergency Management Agency (MEMA) as state administrator for exercise and training for the National Capital Region, she worked with various local, state, federal and private sector partners to evaluate the effectiveness of response to both small- and large-scale disasters. Harman helped coordinate disaster declarations under the Stafford Act; she counseled counties on assistance that was available. Harman helped coordinate EMAC National Coordinating Team (NCT) requests to provide aid to affected areas. She led Maryland's NIMS rollout efforts and during Hurricane Katrina and Hurricane Rita, Harman served as the state liaison under the incident management system and coordinated efforts to receive evacuees from affected states.

She received her master's in business administration from California Pacific University, and her master's degree in Emergency Health Services from the University of Maryland.

Harman is known for having a focus on the health and safety of First Responders across the Nation. She addresses this important need through training in an effort to maximize first responder performance while working in hazardous conditions and environments.  In May 2009, Harman testified before the House Subcommittee on Railroads, Pipelines and Hazardous Materials on Reauthorization of the Department of Transportation’s Hazardous Materials Safety Program on how to best improve our nation’s hazardous materials response capabilities and keep first responders safe.

Harman has served as a faculty member for several universities, including the Johns Hopkins University School of Medicine; the University of Maryland Fire and Rescue Institute; George Washington University, and Northwestern State University.

References

1973 births
Living people
Federal Emergency Management Agency officials
United States Department of Homeland Security officials
University of Maryland, College Park alumni
American firefighters
People from Fairfax, Virginia